Neutrality (Spanish:Neutralidad) is a 1949 drama film directed by Eusebio Fernández Ardavín and starring Adriana Benetti, Jorge Mistral and Manuel Luna. During the Second World War a German refugee is able to escape to America with the help of a neutral Spanish ship.

Partial cast
   Adriana Benetti as Monika  
 Jorge Mistral as Ignaz, 1. Schiffsoffizier  
 Manuel Monroy as Ferdinand, 2. Offizier  
 Gérard Tichy  as Deutscher Offizier  
 A.N. Gosling as Amerikanischer Offizier  
 Jesús Tordesillas as Spanischer Kapitän  
 Manuel Luna as Blinder Passagier  
 José Prada  as Senor Andes 
 Valeriano Andrés 
 Mario Berriatúa

References

Bibliography 
 Antonio Petrucci. Twenty Years of Cinema in Venice. International Exhibition of Cinematographic Art, 1952.

External links 
 

1949 drama films
Spanish drama films
1949 films
1940s Spanish-language films
Films directed by Eusebio Fernández Ardavín
Seafaring films
Spanish black-and-white films
1940s Spanish films